The 2017 Supertaça Cândido de Oliveira was the 39th edition of the Supertaça Cândido de Oliveira. It took place on 5 August 2017 and featured the winners of the 2016–17 Primeira Liga and 2016–17 Taça de Portugal, Benfica, and the runners-up of the Taça de Portugal, Vitória de Guimarães. Benfica won their second consecutive Supertaça Cândido de Oliveira for the first time and seventh overall.

Venue
The Aveiro Municipal Stadium was announced as the venue on 6 June 2017, following the decision of the Portuguese Football Federation Directive Board. That same day, the Board announced that the stadium would also be the venue of the following year's Supertaça Cândido de Oliveira. This was the eight time Aveiro Municipal Stadium hosted the Supertaça (it had been the venue in the 2009, 2010, 2011, 2012, 2013, 2014 and 2016 editions).

Background
Benfica made their 19th Supertaça appearance. Their last appearance had been in 2016, when they defeated Braga 3–0 at the Estádio Municipal de Aveiro. Benfica had won six Supertaças, in 1980, 1985, 1989, 2005, 2014 and 2016.

Vitória de Guimarães played in the fixture for the fourth time. Their last presence had been in 2013 when they lost 3–0 to Porto. Vitória de Guimarães had won one edition against Porto in 1988, 2–0 on aggregate, and had also been runners-up in 2011.

Pre-match

Entry
Benfica qualified for their fourth consecutive Supertaça Cândido de Oliveira by winning the league title. On the penultimate matchday, Benfica won 5–0 against Vitória de Guimarães at the Estádio da Luz to clinch the Primeira Liga for the 36th time and fourth consecutive time for the first time in their history.

Vitória de Guimarães qualified by reaching the cup final, losing to league champions Benfica 2–1.

Broadcasting
The final was broadcast by RTP.

Officials

Ticketing

Venue

Match

Details

Statistics

References

Supertaça Cândido de Oliveira
S.L. Benfica matches
Vitória S.C. matches
2017–18 in Portuguese football
August 2017 sports events in Europe